M117 may refer to:
 M117 bomb
 M-117 (Michigan highway)
 Mercedes-Benz M117 engine